The 2021 Vuelta a Andalucía Ruta del Sol was a road cycling stage race that took place in the Andalusia region of southern Spain between 18 and 22 May 2021. It was the 67th edition of the Vuelta a Andalucía, and was rated as a category-2.Pro event on the 2021 UCI Europe Tour and the 2021 UCI ProSeries calendars.

The race was originally scheduled for 17 to 21 February, but due to the COVID-19 pandemic, it had to be postponed to mid-May.

Teams 
Nine UCI WorldTeams and seven UCI ProTeams made up the sixteen teams that participated in the race. , with six riders, was the only team to not enter the maximum of seven riders. 111 riders started the race, of which 104 finished.

UCI WorldTeams

 
 
 
 
 
 
 
 
 

UCI ProTeams

Route

Stages

Stage 1 
18 May 2021 – La Cala de Mijas to Zahara de la Sierra,

Stage 2 
19 May 2021 – Iznájar to Alcalá la Real,

Stage 3 
20 May 2021 – Beas de Segura to Villarrodrigo,

Stage 4 
21 May 2021 – Baza to Cúllar Vega,

Stage 5 
22 May 2021 – Vera to Pulpí,

Classification leadership table 

 On stage 2, Orluis Aular, who was second in the points classification, wore the green jersey, because first placed Gonzalo Serrano wore the yellow jersey as the leader of the general classification.
 On stage 3, Gonzalo Serrano, who was second in the points classification, wore the green jersey, because first placed Ethan Hayter wore the yellow jersey as the leader of the general classification.
 On stages 4 and 5, Ethan Hayter, who was second in the points classification, wore the green jersey, because first placed Miguel Ángel López wore the yellow jersey as the leader of the general classification.

Final classification standings

General classification

Points classification

Mountains classification

Sprints classification

Andalusian rider classification

Spanish rider classification

Combination classification

Team classification

Notes

References

Sources

External links 
 

2021
2021 UCI Europe Tour
2021 UCI ProSeries
2021 in Spanish road cycling
May 2021 sports events in Spain
Cycling events postponed due to the COVID-19 pandemic